Streptogrisin B (Streptomyces griseus protease B, pronase B, serine proteinase B, Streptomyces griseus proteinase B, Streptomyces griseus proteinase 1, Streptomyces griseus serine proteinase B) is an enzyme. This enzyme catalyses the following chemical reaction

 Hydrolysis of proteins with trypsin-like specificity

This enzyme is isolated from Streptomyces griseus.

References

External links 
 

EC 3.4.21